Cooleeney Farm produces a number of cheeses from both cow's milk and goat's milk from their premises near Thurles in County Tipperary, Ireland.

The Maher family are fourth generation farmers who use the milk from their own pedigree Friesian dairy herd to make their range of cheeses. All Cooleeney Farm cheeses are made with vegetarian rennet.

Range
Cooleeney Farm produce a range of seven cheeses. Five are made using cow's milk from their own farm, one from goat's milk from their own farm, and one using goat's milk from a nearby source.

Awards
 2011 - Great Taste Awards for soft Cheese, 2 stars for Gortnamona.
 2010 - World Cheese Awards - Silver medal
 2010 - Great Taste Awards
 2010 - Artisan Producer of the Year Award
 2006 - British Cheese Awards

See also

 List of cheesemakers

References

Irish cheeses
Cow's-milk cheeses
Cheesemakers
Goat's-milk cheeses
Dairy products companies of Ireland